Six Strings is the fourth studio album by Australian musician Ian Moss, released in May 2005. It is the first acoustic album recorded by Moss and includes re-recorded tracks from his solo career, Cold Chisel songs and covers.

Moss said “It took a bit of nerve for me to unplug and play acoustic, but it injected this freshness into my playing. It was a significant new path for me.”

In 2015, Moss announced a national acoustic theatre tour in celebration of the 10th anniversary of Six Strings with Moss saying "I'm amazed at how much colour and variation and emotion I've been able to get with just voice, guitar and a foot tapping on the floor. Less is more.".
The album was re-released with five extra tracks and a couple of alternate versions  and was certified gold in Australia in 2015.

Track listing

2015 re-release
CD 1
 "Telephone Booth"
 "Saturday Night"
 "Tucker's Daughter" 
 "Love Will Carry Us Along"
 "Jealous Guy"
 "Never Before"
 "Shape I'm In"
 "Green River"
 "Two Seconds Too Long"
 "Piccolo Bar"
 "Angel Eyes"

CD 2
 "Tempted" 
 "The Party's Over"
 "All Alone on a Rock"
 "Bow River"
 "Catfish Blues"
 "My Baby"
 "Such a Beautiful Thing"
 "Purple Haze"
 "Message from Baghdad"
 "Song for Julian"

Certifications

Personnel
Ian Moss - Vocals, Guitar

References

2005 albums
Liberation Records albums
Ian Moss albums